Lee Ka Yiu (born 10 April 1992 in Hong Kong) is a Hong Kong professional footballer who currently plays for Hong Kong Premier League club Southern.

Club career

Sham Shui Po
Lee Ka Yiu joined Sham Shui Po youth team when he was young. In 2008, Third 'District' League team Sham Shui Po youth team members were all promoted to the first team to gain experience. In the first season, the club reached the final of Junior Shield, which eventually lost 0–2 to Shatin. The club then gained promotion to Second Division in their second season.

Lee helped the club to gain promote from Second Division by scoring 4 goals in 16 games in the 2010–11 season. In the 2011–12 season, he featured every game for Sham Shui Po, including 18 league games, 2 Senior Shield, 2 League Cup and 2 FA Cup matches. However, the team eventually regulated after finishing on the second last place of the league.

Yokohama FC Hong Kong
Lee joined Yokohama FC Hong Kong in July 2012, alongside former Sham Shui Po manager Lee Chi Kin and other Sham Shui Po players.

Tai Po
After the conclusion of his contract, Lee once again followed Lee Chi Kin, this time to newly promoted HKPL club Tai Po. He was revealed as a Tai Po player during the club's season kick off event on 19 July 2016.

Eastern
On 17 July 2019, Eastern announced Lee's signing at their season opening media event. He left the club on 9 July 2022.

Southern
Lee signed with Southern on 18 July 2022.

Career statistic

Club
 As of 4 May 2013

International

As of 13 November 2018. Scores and results list Hong Kong's goal tally first.

Notes
1.  Since Sham Shui Po was competing in lower divisions, they could only join the Junior Shield instead of Senior Shield.
2.  Hong Kong Junior Challenge Shield was not held in the 2009–10 season.

Honours

Club
Eastern
 Hong Kong Senior Shield: 2019–20
 Hong Kong FA Cup: 2019–20

Tai Po
 Hong Kong Premier League: 2018–19

References

External links
 

1992 births
Living people
Hong Kong footballers
Hong Kong international footballers
Hong Kong Premier League players
Association football midfielders
Association football forwards
Sham Shui Po SA players
Yokohama FC Hong Kong players
Tai Po FC players
Eastern Sports Club footballers
Southern District FC players
Footballers at the 2014 Asian Games
Asian Games competitors for Hong Kong